Christ Lutheran Academy was a community Christian high school open for students of all denominations and aimed to offer a Christ-centered high school experience.

First established in 2001, Christ Lutheran Academy operated in a Church in Naperville, Illinois, but then operated in a new building on 127th Street in Plainfield, Illinois.  The school permanently closed in August 2010, largely due to lack of funding.  As of July 2016, the 127th Street building was demolished.

External links 
 Christ Lutheran Academy 

2001 establishments in Illinois
Defunct schools in Illinois